Delovõje Vedomosti (Estonian romanization of) is a Russian-language financial newspaper published in Estonia, founded in 1996.

Delovõje Vedomosti is a weekly newspaper, which offers mostly content related to economy, but also covers politics, culture and entertainment.

The newspaper's first issue was released on 27 November 1996. It is published by AS Äripäev, which is owned by the Swedish media group Bonnier.

See also 
 Äripäev

References

External links 
 Delovõje Vedomosti online news portal

Business newspapers
Russian-language newspapers published in Estonia
Publications established in 1996
Mass media in Tallinn
1996 establishments in Estonia